Stallion Laguna Football Club is a Filipino professional football club based in Biñan, Laguna. The club competes in the Philippines Football League, the top tier of football in the Philippines.

In 2002, the club was founded as Stallion Football Club. The club competed in the Metro Manila-based United Football League, earning promotion to Division 1 after finishing as runners-up in the 2011 season. The club proceeded to compete in the UFL Division 1 from 2012 to 2016, winning one United Football League title and one UFL Cup, both in the 2012–2013 UFL season.

Originally based in Barotac Nuevo, Iloilo, the club moved to the Biñan Football Stadium in Biñan, Laguna in 2016, when the club formally submitted its application to join the Philippines Football League, the first true national football league in the Philippines. Stallion Laguna also used 4,500-capacity McKinley Hill Stadium for some home games.

History
In 2001, a group of football enthusiasts from Barotac Nuevo, Iloilo thought of establishing a club that would regularly compete in football tournaments held in the town. The name of the club was conceptualized during a drinking session where most of the group were drinking Red Horse Stallion beer. The group decided to name the club Stallion Football Club after Tamasak, the town's folklore hero, a pure white stallion known for its strength.

The club made its debut in the 2001 Barotac Nuevo Football Club (BNFC) Seven-a-Side Football Tournament. They played under the name Stallion Aqua Sports at the 2002 Cocomangas Beach Football Tournament in Boracay due to sponsorship deal with Aqua Sport Shop Boracay. They returned to the BNFC as the Stallion Bulalo Soldier in 2003.

Stallion was formally established as a proper club in 2006, and continued to participate in various local competitions in the Philippines including the Siniki Football Festival and other tournaments in Cebu, Boracay, Subic, Metro Manila and Capiz.

Initially the club culture revolved around building friendship among its members and Red Horse Stallion drinking session usually held after each match of the club. However the club decided to begin catering to a wider demographic in order to develop football in their locale. Stallion organized the first edition of its own football tournament, the Stallion Football Club Seven-a-Side Football Tournament in order to promote football in Barotac Nuevo and in early 2019 set up Stallion Kids, a football development program for the youth.

It began competing in national football tournaments and leagues such as the United Football League (UFL) in 2010 and the 2011 PFF-Smart Club Championships. In the later tournament, the club lost to San Beda FC in the quarterfinals, 2–1.

2010–11: Promotion to UFL Division 1
Stallion FC finished as one of the top three teams in the UFL Division 2 during the 2011 United Football League season. This automatically earned the club a promotion to the UFL Division 1 along with Manila Nomads and Pasargad.

2011–12: Debut in first division
At the start of the 2012 United Football League season, in the club's first match in the UFL Division 1, Stallion defeated Philippine Navy, 6–0. In their next match, the team defeated the 2011 UFL Cup and then current league champions Philippine Air Force, 4–1. In addition, the club also scored a 3–2 win against eventual 2012 season champions Global FC.

To close the season, Stallion defeated Philippine Army in their last couple of games. With these two wins, the club secured the fourth spot of the top division.

2012–13: New signings and affiliate team
In preparation for the 2013 season, aside from sharing its coaching staff with an affiliate Sta. Lucia-owned club, Stallion signed footballers Rhante Bayquin and Won Hyung Lee to beef up their lineup for the 2012 UFL Cup. In addition, the club also got the services of Spanish midfielder Rufino Familiar Sanchez and defender Joaquin Canas Garcia from Internacional de Madrid CF, an association football club from Moraleja de Enmedio in Community of Madrid, Spain that plays in the Tercera División.

In August 2012, Stallion announced that it has signed Filipino international player and Philippines national under-23 football team captain Jason de Jong for the upcoming season. De Jong, who also represents the Philippines national football team in the international level, was initially offered to play for Stallion in March 2012, but then he was offered a trial with Ayr United. Eventually, due to financial constraints, the Scottish First Division side was forced to let De Jong go, which enabled Stallion to finally sign him to a contract.

UFL Cup champions

The club started in the group stages and topped Group D with 9 points (3 wins, 1 loss) to qualify in the knockout stage. In the quarterfinals of the cup's knockout stage, Stallion defeated General Trias FC on penalty shoot out with 5–4 result. In the semi-finals, the club edged Green Archers United with a scoreline of 3–1, booking them for the finals.

On 17 December 2012, Stallion FC defeated Global FC on the finals of the UFL Cup in the Rizal Memorial Stadium, Manila with a score of 2–1, getting the cup title and its first UFL crown. Team captain Ruben Doctora and Spanish striker Rufo Sánchez scored one goal apiece to upset previous league champions Global. Doctora won the Golden Ball award, the tournament's equivalent to the Most Valuable Player award, while Wilson Muñoz bagged the Golden Glove trophy as the best goalkeeper in the competition.

PFF Championship early exit
To prepare for the second season of the PFF National Men's Club Championship, Stallion enlisted the services of American soccer midfielder Jeremy Taylor Hohn and Goalkeeper Cyrus Andre Mohseni, who was part of the under-18 team of the U.S. Soccer Development Academy.

On 13 January 2013, Negros Occidental-based club Ceres FC pulled a stunning 1–0 upset over Stallion FC, eliminating the 2012 UFL Cup champions from the 2013 PFF National Men's Club Championship.

UFL Division 1 campaign
After a disappointing run in the 2013 PFF National Men's Club Championship, Stallion signed several foreign football players to bolster its lineup including Colombian-born American forward Diego Barrera, Argentinian midfielder Matthias Bonvehi, Japanese midfielder Yuuri Ishizuka, Brazilian-Japanese midfielder Daniel Matsunaga, and Australian defender Jesse Martindale. In addition, several players from local clubs transferred to Stallion such as Brazilian goalkeeper Guilherme Hasegawa from Team Socceroo FC and midfielder Shirmar Felongco from Ceres FC.

On 13 June 2013, Stallion clinched the Division 1 championship of the 2013 United Football League after Kaya came away with a 3–2 victory against Global at the Emperador Stadium in Mckinley Hill, Taguig.

Philippines Football League
Stallion FC were set to participate at the inaugural season of the Philippines Football League (PFL) in 2017. They designated Biñan Football Stadium as their home turf and by mid-January 2017 already started pre-season training and tryouts in the venue. The club renamed themselves as Stallion Laguna FC as part of their participation in the PFL.

In 2019, Stallion Laguna joined the Philippine Premier League (PPL), a league which was meant to replace the PFL. However they along with United Makati withdrew from the league on April 26, 2019, a day before the first match day of the league citing concerns regarding what the Stallion management see as a lack of professionalism and transparency regarding the league's management.

The participated in the 2019 PFL season which was held in lieu of the dissolved PPL.

Youth
Stallion Laguna runs a youth football academy known as the Stallion Youth Academy. Starting the 2019 season the academy would be merging with the Makati Football Club (MFC) with the existing academy of the club to be renamed as the Stallion MFC Youth Academy. MFC was managed by Stallion former player Selu Lozano who would be rejoining the club as a player and corporate manager for the 2019 season.

Kit manufacturers and shirt sponsors

 1Major shirt sponsor (names located at the front of the shirt).
 2Secondary sponsor (names mostly located at the back of the shirt).

Players

First team squad

Out on loan

Board and staff

Head coaches

Honors

Domestic

Leagues
 United Football League Division 1
Winners: 2013
 United Football League Division 2
Runners-up: 2011

Cups
 UFL Cup
Winners: 2012
 Stallions FC Invitational Cup
Winners: 2017

Records

Notes

References
http://www.sunstar.com.ph/cagayan-de-oro/sports/2017/01/17/stallions-fc-laguna-prepares-philippine-football-league-520527 http://www.pressreader.com/philippines/manila-times/20170128/282020442014107

External links 
Official Website of Stallion FC

Stallion F.C. at the United Football League

Stadium picture

Stallion Laguna
Stallion Laguna
Association football clubs established in 2002
2002 establishments in the Philippines
Sports in Iloilo